Nathan Khalid Tomasello (born May 1, 1994) is an American freestyle and graduated folkstyle wrestler who competes at 57 kilograms. In freestyle, Tomasello has medaled at multiple national and international competitions, most notably the Alexander Medved Prizes, the Bill Farrell Memorial and the US Nationals. In college, he was an NCAA champion in 2015, a four–time Big Ten Conference champion and a four–time All–American for the Ohio State Buckeyes.

Folkstyle career

High school 
As a high schooler, Tomasello was a four–time Ohio (OHSAA) state champion in Division II out of the Cuyahoga Valley Christian Academy. He graduated with an undefeated record of 51 wins and no losses as a senior and 178 wins with 5 losses overall. Tomasello was then recruited by the Ohio State University.

College 
During his first collegiate season (2013–14), Tomasello was redshirted and compiled an undefeated 19–0 record competing in open tournaments. As a freshman, Tomasello claimed the NCAA and Big Ten Conference titles after a highly successful regular season, ending his season with a 33–4 record. As a sophomore and a junior, Tomasello remained undefeated throughout both regular seasons, claimed the B1G titles, but both times lost in the semifinals of the national tournaments and came back for third, becoming a three–time All–American. In his final year, his only loss during regular season was to freshman phenom from Iowa Spencer Lee, a multiple–time age–group freestyle World Champion, and would go on to compile a 7–1 record during this time frame. After becoming a four–time B1G champion, at his last NCAAs, Tomasello was once again knocked off on the semifinals, coming back to place third, giving an end to an outstanding career.

Freestyle career

2014–2017 
During his first years competing in the senior freestyle level (2014–2016), Tomasello racked up experience from the US Nationals and the US Olympic Team Trials.

Throughout 2017, Tomasello claimed the Ion Corneanu Memorial International, placed third at the US Open and the US World Team Trials and second at the US U23 World Team Trials, and Alexandr Medved Prizes.

2019–2021 
After not competing in 2018, Thomasello placed sixth at the 2019 US Open and second at the Bill Farrell Memorial as well as the US Senior Nationals, qualifying for the 2020 US Olympic Team Trials with the latter result. In 2020, Thomasello only got to compete once due to the COVID-19 pandemic, placing second at the Cerro Pelado International.

After more than a year of inactiveness, Tomasello competed at the rescheduled US Olympic Team Trials in April 1–3, 2021 as the seventh seed, in an attempt to represent the United States at the 2020 Summer Olympics. After losing first round to US National Champion Vito Arujau, he bounced back with two straight victories to place third. 

Tomasello then registered to compete at the prestigious 2021 Poland Open in early June, and moved from 57 to 61 kg on a days notice. Tomasello ultimately went 0–3, suffering dominant losses.

Tomasello came back in big fashion 2021 US World Team Trials from September 11 to 12, intending to represent the country at the World Championships at 61 kilograms. He scored brilliant upsets over 2019 NCAA champion Nick Suriano and returning World medalist Joe Colon to make his way to the best-of-three finale, where he faced Pan American Games gold medalist Daton Fix. He was dropped in two straight matches, placing second at the tournament.

Freestyle record

! colspan="7"| Senior Freestyle Matches
|-
!  Res.
!  Record
!  Opponent
!  Score
!  Date
!  Event
!  Location
|-
! style=background:white colspan=7 |
|-
|Loss
|52–24
|align=left| Daton Fix
|style="font-size:88%"|0–7
|style="font-size:88%" rowspan=2|September 12, 2021
|style="font-size:88%" rowspan=5|2021 US World Team Trials
|style="text-align:left;font-size:88%;" rowspan=5| Lincoln, Nebraska
|-
|Loss
|52–23
|align=left| Daton Fix
|style="font-size:88%"|3–8
|-
|Win
|52–22
|align=left| Joe Colon
|style="font-size:88%"|TF 15–2
|style="font-size:88%" rowspan=3|September 11, 2021
|-
|Win
|51–22
|align=left| Nick Suriano
|style="font-size:88%"|3–0
|-
|Win
|50–22
|align=left| Daniel Deshazer
|style="font-size:88%"|TF 11–1
|-
! style=background:white colspan=7 |
|-
|Loss
|49–22
|align=left| Ravi Kumar Dahiya
|style="font-size:88%"|5–9
|style="font-size:88%" rowspan=3|June 9, 2021
|style="font-size:88%" rowspan=3|2021 Poland Open
|style="text-align:left;font-size:88%;" rowspan=3|
 Warsaw, Poland
|-
|Loss
|49–21
|align=left| Gulomjon Abdullaev
|style="font-size:88%"|TF 1–12
|-
|Loss
|49–20
|align=left| Adlan Askarov
|style="font-size:88%"|TF 0–14
|-
! style=background:white colspan=7 |
|-
|Win
|49–19
|align=left| Zane Richards
|style="font-size:88%"|12–6
|style="font-size:88%" rowspan=3|April 2–3, 2021
|style="font-size:88%" rowspan=3|2020 US Olympic Team Trials
|style="text-align:left;font-size:88%;" rowspan=3| Forth Worth, Texas
|-
|Win
|48–18
|align=left| Sean Russell
|style="font-size:88%"|13–6
|-
|Loss
|47–18
|align=left| Vito Arujau
|style="font-size:88%"|2–3
|-
! style=background:white colspan=7 |
|-
|Loss
|47-17
|align=left| Reineri Andreu
|style="font-size:88%"|1-3
|style="font-size:88%" rowspan=3|February 9-17, 2020
|style="font-size:88%" rowspan=3|2020 Granma y Cerro Pelado International Open
|style="text-align:left;font-size:88%;" rowspan=3|
 Havana, Cuba
|-
|Win
|47-16
|align=left| Nodirjon Safarov
|style="font-size:88%"|7-0
|-
|Win
|46-16
|align=left| Santiago Hernandez
|style="font-size:88%"|TF 12-2
|-
! style=background:white colspan=7 |
|-
|Loss
|45-16
|align=left| Spencer Lee
|style="font-size:88%"|2-8
|style="font-size:88%" rowspan=5|December 22, 2019
|style="font-size:88%" rowspan=5|2019 US Nationals - US Olympic Trials Qualifier
|style="text-align:left;font-size:88%;" rowspan=5|
 Ford Worth, Texas
|-
|Win
|45-15
|align=left| Nahshon Garrett
|style="font-size:88%"|TF 13-2
|-
|Win
|44-15
|align=left| Frank Perelli
|style="font-size:88%"|TF 10-0
|-
|Win
|43-15
|align=left| Gabriel Townsell
|style="font-size:88%"|TF 13-2
|-
|Win
|42-15
|align=left| Daniel DeShazer
|style="font-size:88%"|9-2
|-
! style=background:white colspan=7 |
|-
|Loss
|41-15
|align=left| Seth Gross
|style="font-size:88%"|TF 1-11
|style="font-size:88%" rowspan=5|November 16, 2019
|style="font-size:88%" rowspan=5|2019 Bill Farrell Memorial International Open
|style="text-align:left;font-size:88%;" rowspan=5|
 New York, New York
|-
|Win
|41-14
|alignleft| Zane Richards
|style="font-size:88%"|8-6
|-
|Win
|40-14
|alignleft| Sean Russell
|style="font-size:88%"|9-5
|-
|Win
|39-14
|alignleft| Guesseppe Rea
|style="font-size:88%"|TF 11-0
|-
|Win
|38-14
|align=left| Brandon Escobar
|style="font-size:88%"|TF 10-0
|-
! style=background:white colspan=7 |
|-
|Loss
|37-14
|align=left| Thomas Gilman
|style="font-size:88%"|DQ
|style="font-size:88%" rowspan=4|April 28, 2019
|style="font-size:88%" rowspan=4|2019 US Open Wrestling Championships
|style="text-align:left;font-size:88%;" rowspan=4|
 Las Vegas, Nevada
|-
|Win
|37-13
|align=left| Frank Perrelli
|style="font-size:88%"|TF 10-0
|-
|Win
|36-13
|align=left| Eddie Klimara
|style="font-size:88%"|TF 12-1
|-
|Win
|35-13
|align=left| Skyler Petry
|style="font-size:88%"|TF 12-2
|-
! style=background:white colspan=7 |
|-
|Loss
|34-13
|align=left| Daton Fix
|style="font-size:88%"|4-7
|style="font-size:88%" rowspan=4|October 8, 2017
|style="font-size:88%" rowspan=2|2017 US U23 World Team Trials
|style="text-align:left;font-size:88%;" rowspan=4|
 Rochester, Minnesota
|-
|Loss
|34-12
|align=left| Daton Fix
|style="font-size:88%"|7-8
|-
|Win
|34-11
|align=left| Timothy Lambert
|style="font-size:88%"|TF 10-0
|style="font-size:88%" rowspan=2|2017 US U23 World Team Trials Challenge Tournament
|-
|Win
|33-11
|align=left| Gage Curry
|style="font-size:88%"|TF 12-1
|-
! style=background:white colspan=7 |
|-
|Loss
|32-11
|align=left| Nikolai Okhlopkov
|style="font-size:88%"|1-5
|style="font-size:88%" rowspan=4|September 16, 2017
|style="font-size:88%" rowspan=4|2017 Alexander Medved Prizes Memorial International
|style="text-align:left;font-size:88%;" rowspan=4|
 Minsk, Belarus
|-
|Win
|32-10
|alignleft| Michail Ivanov
|style="font-size:88%"|6-1
|-
|Win
|31-10
|alignleft| Armen Arakelian
|style="font-size:88%"|TF 10-0
|-
|Win
|30-10
|align=left| Azamat Toibek
|style="font-size:88%"|TF 13-2
|-
! style=background:white colspan=7 |
|-
|Win
|29-10
|align=left| Nikolai Okhlopkov
|style="font-size:88%"|8-1
|style="font-size:88%" rowspan=3|June 23, 2017
|style="font-size:88%" rowspan=3|2017 Ion Corneanu & Ladislau Simon Memorial
|style="text-align:left;font-size:88%;" rowspan=3|
 Bucharest, Romania
|-
|Win
|28-10
|align=left| Ivan Guidea
|style="font-size:88%"|11-5
|-
|Win
|27-10
|align=left| Ivan Zamfirov
|style="font-size:88%"|TF 12-2
|-
! style=background:white colspan=7 |
|-
|Win
|26-10
|align=left| Tyler Graff
|style="font-size:88%"|6-2
|style="font-size:88%" rowspan=4|June 10, 2017
|style="font-size:88%" rowspan=4|2017 US World Team Trials Challenge Tournament
|style="text-align:left;font-size:88%;" rowspan=4|
 Lincoln, Nebraska
|-
|Loss
|25-10
|align=left| Thomas Gilman
|style="font-size:88%"|2-6
|-
|Win
|25-9
|align=left| Alan Waters
|style="font-size:88%"|8-5
|-
|Win
|24-9
|align=left| Frank Perrelli
|style="font-size:88%"|7-3
|-
! style=background:white colspan=7 |
|-
|Win
|23-9
|align=left| Frank Perrelli
|style="font-size:88%"|9-7
|style="font-size:88%" rowspan=6|April 28, 2017
|style="font-size:88%" rowspan=6|2017 US Open Wrestling Championships
|style="text-align:left;font-size:88%;" rowspan=6|
 Las Vegas, Nevada
|-
|Win
|22-9
|align=left| Zach Sanders
|style="font-size:88%"|6-4
|-
|Loss
|21-9
|align=left| Tony Ramos
|style="font-size:88%"|2-2
|-
|Win
|21-8
|align=left| Nico Megaludis
|style="font-size:88%"|5-4
|-
|Win
|20-8
|align=left| Paul Konrath
|style="font-size:88%"|TF 10-0
|-
|Win
|19-8
|align=left| Sean Donnelly
|style="font-size:88%"|TF 10-0
|-
! style=background:white colspan=7 |
|-
|Loss
|18-8
|align=left| Alan Waters
|style="font-size:88%"|0-6
|style="font-size:88%" rowspan=4|April 9, 2016
|style="font-size:88%" rowspan=4|2016 US Olympic Team Trials Challenge Tournament
|style="text-align:left;font-size:88%;" rowspan=4|
 Iowa City, Iowa
|-
|Win
|18-7
|align=left| Angel Escobedo
|style="font-size:88%"|Injury
|-
|Loss
|17-7
|align=left| Tyler Graff
|style="font-size:88%"|TF 0-10
|-
|Win
|17-6
|align=left| Nico Megaludis
|style="font-size:88%"|4-3
|-
! style=background:white colspan=7 |
|-
|Win
|16-6
|align=left| Joe Colon
|style="font-size:88%"|Injury
|style="font-size:88%" rowspan=7|December 18, 2015
|style="font-size:88%" rowspan=7|2015 US Senior National Wrestling Championships
|style="text-align:left;font-size:88%;" rowspan=7|
 Las Vegas, Nevada
|-
|Loss
|15-6
|align=left| Coleman Scott
|style="font-size:88%"|TF 0-10
|-
|Win
|15-5
|align=left| Ali Naser
|style="font-size:88%"|3-1
|-
|Win
|14-5
|align=left| Stevan Mićić
|style="font-size:88%"|4-2
|-
|Loss
|13-5
|align=left| Joe Colon
|style="font-size:88%"|Fall
|-
|Win
|13-4
|align=left| Dan Mitcheff
|style="font-size:88%"|TF 10-0
|-
|Win
|12-4
|align=left| Rene Ruiz
|style="font-size:88%"|TF 10-0
|-
! style=background:white colspan=7 |
|-
|Loss
|11-4
|align=left| Ali Naser
|style="font-size:88%"|6-6
|style="font-size:88%" rowspan=6|November 7, 2015
|style="font-size:88%" rowspan=6|2015 Bill Farrell Memorial International
|style="text-align:left;font-size:88%;" rowspan=6|
 New York, New York
|-
|Win
|11-3
|align=left| Obenson Blanc
|style="font-size:88%"|4-3
|-
|Win
|10-3
|align=left| Nick Simmons
|style="font-size:88%"|5-3
|-
|Loss
|9-3
|align=left| Daniel Dennis
|style="font-size:88%"|2-5
|-
|Win
|9-2
|align=left| Bradley Pataky
|style="font-size:88%"|9-1
|-
|Win
|8-2
|align=left| Michael Arciaga
|style="font-size:88%"|TF 10-0
|-
! style=background:white colspan=7 |
|-
|Loss
|7-2
|align=left| Matt McDonough
|style="font-size:88%"|4-6
|style="font-size:88%" rowspan=5|June 7, 2015
|style="font-size:88%" rowspan=5|2015 ASICS USA Wrestling National Championships
|style="text-align:left;font-size:88%;" rowspan=5|
 Las Vegas, Nevada
|-
|Win
|7-1
|align=left| Frank Perrelli
|style="font-size:88%"|9-1
|-
|Win
|6-1
|align=left| Brad Pataky
|style="font-size:88%"|10-5
|-
|Win
|5-1
|align=left| Devane Dodgens
|style="font-size:88%"|TF 10-0
|-
|Loss
|4-1
|align=left| Tyler Graff
|style="font-size:88%"|Fall
|-
! style=background:white colspan=7 |
|-
|Win
|4-0
|align=left| Ben Willeford
|style="font-size:88%"|TF 10-0
|style="font-size:88%" rowspan=4|May 4, 2014
|style="font-size:88%" rowspan=4|2014 Phil Portuese NE Regional
|style="text-align:left;font-size:88%;" rowspan=4|
 East Stroudsburg, Pennsylvania
|-
|Win
|3-0
|align=left| Steven Mytych
|style="font-size:88%"|TF 11-0
|-
|Win
|2-0
|align=left| Tanner Shoap
|style="font-size:88%"|TF 13-2
|-
|Win
|1-0
|align=left| Joshjos Antoine
|style="font-size:88%"|TF 11-0
|-

NCAA record

! colspan="8"| NCAA Division I Record
|-
!  Res.
!  Record
!  Opponent
!  Score
!  Date
!  Event
|-
! style=background:lighgrey colspan=6 |End of 2017-2018 Season (senior year)
|-
! style=background:white colspan=6 |2018 NCAA Championships  at 125 lbs
|-
|Win
|100-8
|align=left|Ethan Lizak
|style="font-size:88%"|SV-1 8-6
|style="font-size:88%" rowspan=6|March 17, 2018
|style="font-size:88%" rowspan=6|2018 NCAA Division I National Championships
|-
|Win
|99-8
|align=left|Sebastian Rivera
|style="font-size:88%"|Fall
|-
|Loss
|98-8
|align=left|Spencer Lee
|style="font-size:88%"|Fall
|-
|Win
|98-7
|align=left|Taylor LaMont
|style="font-size:88%"|MD 12-4
|-
|Win
|97-7
|align=left|Ryan Millhof
|style="font-size:88%"|INJ
|-
|Win
|96-7
|align=left|Gabe Townsell
|style="font-size:88%"|Fall
|-
! style=background:white colspan=6 |2018 Big Ten Conference  at 125 lbs
|-
|Win
|95-7
|align=left|Ethan Lizak
|style="font-size:88%"|10-7
|style="font-size:88%" rowspan=4|March 4, 2018
|style="font-size:88%" rowspan=4|2018 Big Ten Conference Championships
|-
|Win
|94-7
|align=left|Spencer Lee
|style="font-size:88%"|2-1
|-
|Win
|93-7
|align=left|Luke Welch
|style="font-size:88%"|MD 14-3
|-
|Win
|92-7
|align=left|Carson Kuhn
|style="font-size:88%"|TF 21-6
|-
|Win
|91-7
|align=left|Sean Fausz
|style="font-size:88%"|12-6
|style="font-size:88%"|Feb 18, 2018
|style="font-size:88%"|Ohio State- North Carolina State Dual
|-
|Win
|90-7
|align=left|Drew Mattin
|style="font-size:88%"|TF 20-5
|style="font-size:88%"|Feb 11, 2019
|style="font-size:88%"|Ohio State - Michigan Dual
|-
|Win
|89-7
|align=left|Carson Kuhn
|style="font-size:88%"|MD 21-12
|style="font-size:88%"|Feb 8, 2019
|style="font-size:88%"|Ohio State - Penn State Dual
|-
|Win
|88-7
|align=left|Luke Welch
|style="font-size:88%"|MD 18-5
|style="font-size:88%"|January 28, 2018
|style="font-size:88%"|Purdue - Ohio State Dual
|-
|Win
|87-7
|align=left|Rayvon Foley
|style="font-size:88%"|7-3
|style="font-size:88%"|Jan 26, 2018
|style="font-size:88%"|Ohio State - Michigan State Dual
|-
|Loss
|86-7
|align=left|Spencer Lee
|style="font-size:88%"|2-3
|style="font-size:88%"|Jan 21, 2018
|style="font-size:88%"|Iowa - Ohio State
|-
|Win
|86-6
|align=left|Ethan Lizak
|style="font-size:88%"|TF 18-3
|style="font-size:88%"|January 12, 2018
|style="font-size:88%"|Minnesota - Ohio State Dual
|-
|Win
|85-6
|align=left|Brandon Cray
|style="font-size:88%"|TF 18-2
|style="font-size:88%"|January 5, 2018
|style="font-size:88%"|Ohio State - Maryland Dual
|-
! style=background:lighgrey colspan=6 |Start of 2017-2018 Season (senior year)
|-
! style=background:lighgrey colspan=6 |End of 2016-2017 Season (junior year)
|-
! style=background:white colspan=6 |2017 NCAA Championships  at 133 lbs
|-
|Win
|84-6
|align=left|Stevan Mićić
|style="font-size:88%"|5-2
|style="font-size:88%" rowspan=6|March 18, 2017
|style="font-size:88%" rowspan=6|2017 NCAA Division I National Championships
|-
|Win
|83-6
|align=left|Eric Montoya
|style="font-size:88%"|4-1
|-
|Loss
|82-6
|align=left|Cory Clark
|style="font-size:88%"|4-7
|-
|Win
|82-5
|align=left|Zane Richards
|style="font-size:88%"|3-1
|-
|Win
|81-5
|align=left|Cam Sykora
|style="font-size:88%"|MD 21-7
|-
|Win
|80-5
|align=left|Korbin Myers
|style="font-size:88%"|MD 13-4
|-
! style=background:white colspan=6 |2017 Big Ten Conference  at 133 lbs
|-
|Win
|79-5
|align=left|Cory Clark
|style="font-size:88%"|5-4
|style="font-size:88%" rowspan=3|March 3, 2017
|style="font-size:88%" rowspan=3|2017 Big Ten Conference Championships
|-
|Win
|78-5
|align=left|Stevan Mićić
|style="font-size:88%"|6-5
|-
|Win
|77-5
|align=left|Scott DelVecchio 
|style="font-size:88%"|6-4
|-
|Win
|76-5
|align=left|Mark Grey
|style="font-size:88%"|Fall
|style="font-size:88%"|February 18, 2018
|style="font-size:88%"|Ohio State - Cornell Dual
|-
|Win
|75-5
|align=left|Mitch McKee
|style="font-size:88%"|Fall
|style="font-size:88%"|Feb 12, 2017
|style="font-size:88%"|Ohio State - Minnesota Dual
|-
|Win
|74-5
|align=left|Eric Montoya
|style="font-size:88%"|5-2
|style="font-size:88%"|Feb 10, 2017
|style="font-size:88%"|Ohio State - Nebraska Dual
|-
|Win
|73-5
|align=left|Scott DelVecchio
|style="font-size:88%"|6-5
|style="font-size:88%"|February 6, 2017
|style="font-size:88%"|Rutgers - Ohio State Dual
|-
|Win
|72-5
|align=left|George Carpenter 
|style="font-size:88%"|TF 22-7
|style="font-size:88%"|February 3, 2017
|style="font-size:88%"|Penn State - Ohio State Dual
|-
|Win
|71-5
|align=left|Phillip Laux
|style="font-size:88%"|10-3
|style="font-size:88%"|Jan 27, 2017
|style="font-size:88%"|Ohio State - Iowa Dual
|-
|Win
|70-5
|align=left|Billy Rappo
|style="font-size:88%"|MD 15-5
|style="font-size:88%"|Jan 22, 2017
|style="font-size:88%"|Maryland - Ohio State Dual
|-
|Win
|69-5
|align=left|Zane Richards
|style="font-size:88%"|MD 12-4
|style="font-size:88%"|January 15, 2017
|style="font-size:88%"|Illinois - Ohio State Dual
|-
|Win
|68-5
|align=left|Michael Cullen
|style="font-size:88%"|MD 18-5
|style="font-size:88%"|January 6, 2017
|style="font-size:88%"|Ohio State - Wisconsin Dual
|-
|Win
|67-5
|align=left|Jason Isparides
|style="font-size:88%"|TF 20-4
|style="font-size:88%"|December 18, 2016
|style="font-size:88%"|Northwestern - Ohio State Dual
|-
|Win
|66-5
|align=left|Jaydin Eierman
|style="font-size:88%"|MD 12-2
|style="font-size:88%"|December 8, 2016
|style="font-size:88%"|Missouri - Ohio State Dual
|-
! style=background:white colspan=6 |2016 Cliff Keen Las Vegas Invitational  at 133 lbs
|-
|Win
|65-5
|align=left|Stevan Mićić
|style="font-size:88%"|3-2
|style="font-size:88%" rowspan=5|December 3, 2016
|style="font-size:88%" rowspan=5|2016 Cliff Keen Las Vegas Invitational
|-
|Win
|64-5
|align=left|Mark Grey
|style="font-size:88%"|8-3
|-
|Win
|63-5
|align=left|Ali Naser
|style="font-size:88%"|9-4
|-
|Win
|62-5
|align=left|Shayne Wireman
|style="font-size:88%"|10-3
|-
|Win
|61-5
|align=left|Dom Latona
|style="font-size:88%"|TF 22-7
|-
! style=background:lighgrey colspan=6 |Start of 2016-2017 Season (junior year)
|-
! style=background:lighgrey colspan=6 |End of 2015-2016 Season (sophomore year)
|-
! style=background:white colspan=6 |2016 NCAA Championships  at 125 lbs
|-
|Win
|60-5
|align=left|David Terao
|style="font-size:88%"|5-3
|style="font-size:88%" rowspan=6|March 19, 2016
|style="font-size:88%" rowspan=6|2016 NCAA Division I National Championships
|-
|Win
|59-5
|align=left|Conor Youtsey
|style="font-size:88%"|MD 10-1
|-
|Loss
|58-5
|align=left|Thomas Gilman
|style="font-size:88%"|SV–1 Fall
|-
|Win
|58-4
|align=left|Dylan Peters
|style="font-size:88%"|10-4
|-
|Win
|57-4
|align=left|Elijah Oliver
|style="font-size:88%"|MD 11-2
|-
|Win
|56-4
|align=left|Kyle Larson
|style="font-size:88%"|TF 18-0
|-
! style=background:white colspan=6 |2016 Big Ten Conference  at 125 lbs
|-
|Win
|55-4
|align=left|Nico Megaludis
|style="font-size:88%"|TB-1 3-1
|style="font-size:88%" rowspan=4|March 6, 2016
|style="font-size:88%" rowspan=4|2016 Big Ten Conference Championships
|-
|Win
|54-4
|align=left|Tim Lambert
|style="font-size:88%"|10-5
|-
|Win
|53-4
|align=left|Sean McCabe
|style="font-size:88%"|TF 20-5
|-
|Win
|52-4
|align=left|Ben Thornton
|style="font-size:88%"|TF 20-2
|-
|Win
|51-4
|align=left|Sean Russell
|style="font-size:88%"|Fall
|style="font-size:88%"|Feb 22, 2016
|style="font-size:88%"|Edinboro -Ohio State Dual
|-
|Win
|50-4
|align=left|John Jimenez
|style="font-size:88%"|TF 20-5
|style="font-size:88%"|February 12, 2016
|style="font-size:88%"|Wisconsin - Ohio State Dual
|-
|Win
|49-4
|align=left|Nico Megaludis
|style="font-size:88%"|3-1
|style="font-size:88%"|Feb 5, 2016
|style="font-size:88%"|Ohio State - Penn State Dual
|-
|Win
|48-4
|align=left|Luke Schroeder 
|style="font-size:88%"|Fall
|style="font-size:88%"|Jan 31, 2016
|style="font-size:88%"|Ohio State - Purdue Dual
|-
|Win
|47-4
|align=left|Elijah Oliver
|style="font-size:88%"|MD 17-5
|style="font-size:88%"|January 29, 2016
|style="font-size:88%"|Ohio State - Indiana Dual
|-
|Win
|46-4
|align=left|Mitch Rogaliner
|style="font-size:88%"|TF 21-6
|style="font-size:88%"|January 24, 2016
|style="font-size:88%"|Michigan State - Ohio State Dual
|-
|Win
|45-4
|align=left|Tim Lambert
|style="font-size:88%"|MD 16-5
|style="font-size:88%"|January 17, 2016
|style="font-size:88%"|Nebraska - Ohio State Dual
|-
|Win
|44-4
|align=left|Conor Youtsey
|style="font-size:88%"|4-2
|style="font-size:88%"|January 9, 2016
|style="font-size:88%"|Michigan - Ohio State Dual
|-
|Win
|43-4
|align=left|Francis Edelen
|style="font-size:88%"|TF 18-3
|style="font-size:88%"|January 3, 2016
|style="font-size:88%"|Ohio State - Illinois Dual
|-
|Win
|42-4
|align=left|Barlow McGhee
|style="font-size:88%"|MD 10-1
|style="font-size:88%"|December 12, 2015
|style="font-size:88%"|Ohio State - Missouri Dual
|-
! style=background:white colspan=6 |2015 Cliff Keen Invitational  at 125 lbs
|-
|Win
|41-4
|align=left|Joey Dance
|style="font-size:88%"|5-4
|style="font-size:88%" rowspan=5|December 5, 2015
|style="font-size:88%" rowspan=5|2015 Cliff Keen Las Vegas Invitational
|-
|Win
|40-4
|align=left|Ryan Milhoff
|style="font-size:88%"|MD 11-3
|-
|Win
|39-4
|align=left|Paul Petrov
|style="font-size:88%"|9-4
|-
|Win
|38-4
|align=left|Skylar Petry
|style="font-size:88%"|MD 14-3
|-
|Win
|37-4
|align=left|Connor Bolling
|style="font-size:88%"|Fall
|-
|Win
|36-4
|align=left|Evan Cheek
|style="font-size:88%"|TF 23-7
|style="font-size:88%"|November 24, 2015
|style="font-size:88%"|Ohio State - Cleveland State Dual
|-
|Win
|35-4
|align=left|Ares Carpio
|style="font-size:88%"|MD 16-6
|style="font-size:88%"|November 20, 2015
|style="font-size:88%"|Arizona State - Ohio State Dual
|-
|Win
|34-4
|align=left|Nick Herrmann
|style="font-size:88%"|MD 14-6
|style="font-size:88%"|November 13, 2015
|style="font-size:88%"|Virginia - Ohio State Dual
|-
! style=background:lighgrey colspan=6 |Start of 2015-2016 Season (sophomore year)
|-
! style=background:lighgrey colspan=6 |End of 2014-2015 Season (freshman year)
|-
! style=background:white colspan=6 |2015 NCAA Championships  at 125 lbs
|-
|Win
|33-4
|align=left|Zeke Moisey
|style="font-size:88%"|9-5
|style="font-size:88%" rowspan=5|March 21, 2015
|style="font-size:88%" rowspan=5|2015 NCAA Division I National Championships
|-
|Win
|32-4
|align=left|Alan Waters
|style="font-size:88%"|4-2
|-
|Win
|31-4
|align=left|Kory Mines
|style="font-size:88%"|TF 16-1
|-
|Win
|30-4
|align=left|Ben Willeford
|style="font-size:88%"|MD 11-3
|-
|Win
|29-4
|align=left|Joe DeAngelo
|style="font-size:88%"|MD 10-2
|-
! style=background:white colspan=6 |2015 Big Ten Conference  at 125 lbs
|-
|Win
|28-4
|align=left|Thomas Gilman
|style="font-size:88%"|3-2
|style="font-size:88%" rowspan=4|March 7, 2015
|style="font-size:88%" rowspan=4|2015 Big Ten Conference Championships
|-
|Win
|27-4
|align=left|Jesse Delgado
|style="font-size:88%"|3-2
|-
|Win
|26-4
|align=left|Conor Youtsey
|style="font-size:88%"|5-2
|-
|Win
|25-4
|align=left|John Jimenez
|style="font-size:88%"|7-2
|-
|Win
|24-4
|align=left|Scott Parker
|style="font-size:88%"|10-3
|style="font-size:88%"|February 21, 2015
|style="font-size:88%"|Ohio State - Lehigh Dual (National Duals)
|-
|Win
|23-4
|align=left|Kory Mines
|style="font-size:88%"|MD 13-2
|style="font-size:88%"|February 15, 2015
|style="font-size:88%"|Ohio State - Edinboro Dual
|-
|Win
|22-4
|align=left|Ethan Lizak
|style="font-size:88%"|MD 19-6
|style="font-size:88%"|February 6, 2015
|style="font-size:88%"|Minnesota - Ohio State Dual
|-
|Win
|21-4
|align=left|Josh Patrick
|style="font-size:88%"|TF 23-8
|style="font-size:88%"|Feb 1, 2015
|style="font-size:88%"|Ohio State - Rutgers Dual
|-
|Win
|20-4
|align=left|Aaron Assad
|style="font-size:88%"|MD 11-5
|style="font-size:88%"|Jan 30, 2015
|style="font-size:88%"|Purdue - Ohio State Dual
|-
|Win
|19-4
|align=left|Josh Polacek
|style="font-size:88%"|TF 15-0
|style="font-size:88%"|January 25, 2015
|style="font-size:88%"|Ohio State - Maryland Dual
|-
|Win
|18-4
|align=left|Forfeit
|style="font-size:88%"|FF
|style="font-size:88%"|January 23, 2015
|style="font-size:88%"|Indiana - Ohio State Dual
|-
|Win
|17-4
|align=left|Conor Youtsey
|style="font-size:88%"|MD 16-7
|style="font-size:88%"|Jan 18, 2015
|style="font-size:88%"|Ohio State - Michigan Dual
|-
|Win
|16-4
|align=left|Mitch Rogaliner
|style="font-size:88%"|TF 25-9
|style="font-size:88%"|Jan 16, 2015
|style="font-size:88%"|Ohio State - Michigan State Dual
|-
|Win
|15-4
|align=left|Jordan Conaway
|style="font-size:88%"|11-2
|style="font-size:88%"|January 11, 2015
|style="font-size:88%"|Penn State - Ohio State Dual
|-
|Loss
|14-4
|align=left|Thomas Gilman
|style="font-size:88%"|TB–1 1-2
|style="font-size:88%"|January 4, 2015
|style="font-size:88%"|Iowa - Ohio State Dual
|-
|Loss
|14-3
|align=left|Alan Waters
|style="font-size:88%"|8-11
|style="font-size:88%"|December 14, 2014
|style="font-size:88%"|Missouri - Ohio State Dual
|-
! style=background:white colspan=6 |2014 Cliff Keen Las Vegas Invitational  at 125 lbs
|-
|Win
|14-2
|align=left|Trey Andrews
|style="font-size:88%"|11-4
|style="font-size:88%" rowspan=7|December 5, 2014
|style="font-size:88%" rowspan=7|2014 Cliff Keen Las Vegas Invitational 
|-
|Win
|13-2
|align=left|Josh Martinez 
|style="font-size:88%"|6-2
|-
|Win
|12-2
|align=left|Ronnie Bresser
|style="font-size:88%"|4-3
|-
|Win
|11-2
|align=left|Conor Youtsey
|style="font-size:88%"|8-3
|-
|Loss
|10-2
|align=left|Dylan Peters
|style="font-size:88%"|Fall
|-
|Win
|10-1
|align=left|Zeke Moisey 
|style="font-size:88%"|15-10
|-
|Win
|9-1
|align=left|Kevin Hunt
|style="font-size:88%"|Fall
|-
|Win
|8-1
|align=left|Will Mason
|style="font-size:88%"|MD 18-8
|style="font-size:88%"|November 24, 2014
|style="font-size:88%"|Ohio State - Virginia Dual
|-
|Loss
|7-1
|align=left|Joey Dance
|style="font-size:88%"|6-7
|style="font-size:88%"|November 23, 2014
|style="font-size:88%"|Ohio State - Virginia Tech Dual
|-
|Win
|7-0
|align=left|Sean Badua
|style="font-size:88%"|Fall
|style="font-size:88%"|November 15, 2014
|style="font-size:88%"|Ohio State - Army Dual
|-
|Win
|6-0
|align=left|Judson Preskitt
|style="font-size:88%"|Fall
|style="font-size:88%"|November 15, 2014
|style="font-size:88%"|Arizona State - Ohio State Dual
|-
|Win
|5-0
|align=left|Edilberto Vinas
|style="font-size:88%"|TF 20-5
|style="font-size:88%"|November 13, 2014
|style="font-size:88%"|Kent State - Ohio State Dual
|-
! style=background:white colspan=6 |2014 Michigan State Open  at 125 lbs
|-
|Win
|4-0
|align=left|Stevan Mićić
|style="font-size:88%"|MD 11-2
|style="font-size:88%" rowspan=4|November 2, 2014
|style="font-size:88%" rowspan=4|2014 Michigan State Open
|-
|Win
|3-0
|align=left|Johnson Mai
|style="font-size:88%"|MD 18-5
|-
|Win
|2-0
|align=left|Zeke Moisey
|style="font-size:88%"|MD 19-6
|-
|Win
|1-0
|align=left|Robert Elliot
|style="font-size:88%"|TF 16-0
|-
! style=background:lighgrey colspan=6 |Start of 2014-2015 Season (freshman year)

Stats 

!  Season
!  Year
!  School
!  Rank
!  Weigh Class
!  Record
!  Win
!  Bonus
|-
|2018
|Senior
|rowspan=4|Ohio State University
|#2 (3rd)
|125
|16–2
|88.89%
|55.56%
|-
|2017
|Junior
|#1 (3rd)
|133
|24–1
|96.00%
|48.00%
|-
|2016
|Sophomore
|#1 (3rd)
|rowspan=2|125
|27–1
|96.43%
|67.86%
|-
|2015
|Freshman
|#3 (1st)
|33–4
|88.19%
|51.35%
|-
|colspan=5 bgcolor="LIGHTGREY"|Career
|bgcolor="LIGHTGREY"|100–8
|bgcolor="LIGHTGREY"|92.59%
|bgcolor="LIGHTGREY"|55.69%

Awards and honors 

2019
 US Nationals (57 kg)
2018
 NCAA Division I (125 lbs)
 Big Ten Conference (125 lbs)
2017
 US World Trials Challenge (57 kg)
 US World Trials (U23) (57 kg)
 US Open (57 kg)
 NCAA Division I (133 lbs)
 Big Ten Conference (133 lbs)
2016
 NCAA Division I (125 lbs)
 Big Ten Conference (125 lbs)
2015
 NCAA Division I (125 lbs)
 Big Ten Conference (125 lbs)

References

External links
 

American male sport wrestlers
1994 births
Living people
People from Parma, Ohio
Ohio State University alumni
Ohio State Buckeyes wrestlers